Emil Larmi (born 28 September 1996) is a Finnish professional ice hockey goaltender currently playing for the Växjö Lakers of the Swedish Hockey League (SHL).

Playing career
Larmi made his Liiga debut playing with HPK during the 2016–17 Liiga season. On 2 June 2019, Larmi signed a two-year, entry-level contract with the Pittsburgh Penguins of the National Hockey League (NHL).

On 20 December 2019, Larmi was reassigned to the Wheeling Nailers, the ECHL affiliate of the Pittsburgh Penguins, playing 11 games before the season was paused. He was loaned back to HPK for the beginning of the 2020–21 season, playing 12 games before returning to the Wilkes-Barre/Scranton Penguins of the AHL. He played 4 games with Wilkes-Barre before being recalled by the Pittsburgh Penguins Taxi Squad on February 19, 2021.

As an impending free agent from the Penguins, Larmi returned to the Liiga on a full-time basis in agreeing to a two-year contract with the Lahti Pelicans on 31 May 2021. In the following 2021–22 season, Larmi made 32 appearances with the Pelicans collecting 13 wins while posting a .918 save percentage. On 16 February 2022, Larmi left the Pelicans and immediately joined SHL club, Växjö Lakers, for the remainder of the season and following 2022–23 season.

Awards and honors

References

External links
 

1996 births
Living people
Finnish ice hockey goaltenders
HPK players
Lahti Pelicans players
Peliitat Heinola players
Sportspeople from Lahti
Växjö Lakers players
Wilkes-Barre/Scranton Penguins players
Wheeling Nailers players